Karl Felix Heikel (3 June 1844 – 20 May 1921) was a Finland-Swedish banker and politician. He was the son of priest and educator Henrik Heikel, brother of educators and Finnish Baptist pioneers Viktor and Anna Heikel, father of insurance director , cousin of ethnographer Axel Heikel and philologist Ivar Heikel, and uncle of ethnologist Yngvar Heikel.

Life 
Heikel was born on 3 June 1844 in Turku, Finland to Henrik and Wilhelmina Johanna Heikel née Schauman. He had ten siblings. Heikel began his studies in 1862 and received his bachelor of philosophy in 1868. He devoted himself to the educational path and made trips to Scandinavia, Germany and North America to study public schooling (Volksschule), publishing his letters in the newspaper Hufvudstadsbladet. He later married Sigrid Johanna Lovisa Furuhjelm. In 1881 he became director of the commercial institute in Raahe and in 1892 he joined the board of the Nordic Investment Bank in Vyborg (since 1907 in Helsinki).

He was an active municipal councillor and also participated in political life, where, as a member of the Riksdag of the Estates from 1882 to 1906, he held an influential position due to his thorough knowledge and moderate attitude. Heikel was Speaker for the Bourgeoisie Assembly in the 1901 Diet of Finland. He belonged to the Swedish People's Party of Finland.

Heikel published a number of pamphlets on political and economic issues, including  ('The Banking and Monetary System of Finland') (1888).

Heikel died on 20 May 1921 in Helsinki, Finland.

Works 

 Från Förenta Staterna: Nitton bref jemte bihang. Hufvudstadsbladet, Helsinki 1873, new edition of Hufvudstadsbladet, Helsinki 1973
 Yhdysvalloista: Yhdeksäntoista kirjettä liitteineen. J. Häggman and S. Hirvonen, Joensuu 1876
 Om allmänt välstånd. Lättfattliga föreläsningar för arbetare 4. 1876
 Om priset och arbetslönen. Lättfattliga föreläsningar för arbetare 5. 1876
 Om myntet samt olika slag af Spar- och lånekassor. Lättfattliga föreläsningar för arbetare 6. 1877
 Centralt eller moderat? Politisk flygskrift af. F. H. Beijer, Helsinki 1886
 Johan och Baltzar Fellman: Minnesteckning. Oulu 1887
 Vid möten och sammanträden: En kort handledning. Edlund, Helsinki 1887
 Lyhykäinen johdatus kokouksien ja istuntojen pitämiseen. Edlund, Helsinki 1887
 Finlands bank- och penningeväsen: Ett bidrag till belysande af den ekonomiska utvecklingen åren 1809-1887. Edlund, Helsinki 1888
 Vårt nya statsskick. Politiska ströskrifter 1. Helsinki 1918
 Nordiska aktiebanken för handel och industri 1872–1919. Nordiska aktiebanken, Helsinki 1922
 Pohjoismaiden osakepankki kauppaa ja teollisuutta varten. Helsinki 1922

References

External links 

1844 births
1921 deaths
People from Turku
20th-century Finnish businesspeople
19th-century Finnish businesspeople
20th-century Finnish politicians
19th-century Finnish politicians
Swedish-speaking Finns
Members of the Riksdag of the Estates